Tomas Kollar (born April 20, 1982 in Stockholm, Sweden) is a professional Swedish ice hockey coach and former player. He is currently serving as head coach for Malmö Redhawks in the SHL. As a player, he represented Hammarby IF, Djurgårdens IF Hockey, Skellefteå AIK, Södertälje SK, Leksands IF and then lastly Malmö Redhawks whom after finishing his playing career in 2014 continued as a youth coach with J18 and since has served the club through its youth ranks and up to the first team.

Career statistics

References

External links 

1982 births
Living people
Swedish ice hockey left wingers
Djurgårdens IF Hockey players
Skellefteå AIK players
Södertälje SK players
Detroit Red Wings draft picks
Leksands IF players
Ice hockey people from Stockholm
Swedish people of Slovak descent
Malmö Redhawks coaches
Swedish Hockey League coaches